Subterinebrica nigrosignatana is a species of moth of the family Tortricidae. It is found in Loja Province, Ecuador.

The wingspan is about 23 mm.  The ground colour of the forewings is glossy white with black markings. The hindwings are whitish with greyish spots.

Etymology
The species name refers to the black markings of the forewings and is derived from Latin niger (meaning black) and signata (meaning signed).

References

Moths described in 2008
Euliini